Rosa Belén Mayorga Tapia is an Ecuadorian politician who became a member of the National Assembly in 2021.

Life

She was elected to the National Assembly in 2021. She represents the province of Tungurahua.

In June 2022 she was among the members who requested a debate concerning the replacement of President Guillermo Lasso because of his alleged mismanagement. 46 other members supported the request including Vanessa Álava, Jhajaira Urresta, Patricia Mendoza, Victoria Desintonio, Ana María Raffo, Viviana Veloz and Sofía Espín.

References

Members of the National Assembly (Ecuador)
Women members of the National Assembly (Ecuador)
21st-century Ecuadorian politicians
21st-century Ecuadorian women politicians
Living people
Year of birth missing (living people)